Richard de Beaufou (sometimes Richard of Belfou) was a medieval Bishop of Avranches. He was probably related to William de Beaufeu who was Bishop of Norwich from 1085 to 1091. Richard served as bishop from 1134 to 1142.

Notes

References

 

Bishops of Avranches